Barhalyoun or Barhalioun (Arabic: برحليون) is a town in the Bsharri District, North Governorate of Lebanon.

References 

Populated places in the North Governorate
Bsharri District